The Tasmanian Department of State Growth is the Tasmanian Government department with responsibility for driving state growth and to implement the government's long-term plan for creating jobs, growth, and opportunities for all Tasmanians, in Australia.

The department was established on 1 July 2014 through the amalgamation of the Department of Infrastructure, Energy and Resources and the Department of Economic Development, Tourism and the Arts.

The Department is led by its Secretary, Kim Evans. The Department's ministerial portfolio responsibilities are; Minister for the Arts, presently the Hon. Elise Archer MP; Minister for Energy, presently the Hon. Guy Barnett MP; Minister for Science and Technology, presently the Hon. Michael Ferguson MP; Minister for Resources, presently the Hon. Sarah Courtney MP; Minister for Infrastructure, and the Minister for Advanced Manufacturing and Defence Industries, and the Minister for Education and Training, presently the Hon. Jeremy Rockliff MP; Minister for State Growth, presently the Hon. Peter Gutwein MP; Minister for Tourism, Hospitality and Events, and the Minister for Trade, presently the Hon. Will Hodgman MP.

The Department of State Growth is responsible for the following statutory and non-statutory bodies: Antarctic Tasmania, Arts Tasmania, Business Tasmania, Events Tasmania, Forest Practices Authority,  Sustainable Timber Tasmania, Hydro Tasmania, Infrastructure Tasmania, Metro Tasmania, Mineral Resources Tasmania, Office of the Coordinator-General, Private Forests Tasmania, Racing Services Tasmania, Screen Tasmania, Skills Tasmania, Tasmanian Development Board, Tasmanian Institute of Sport, TasRail, Tasmanian Museum and Art Gallery, Tourism Tasmania, TT-Line Company, and the West Coast Wilderness Railway.

See also

 List of Tasmanian government agencies

References

External links
 Official site

Economy of Tasmania
Government departments of Tasmania
Tasmania
Tasmania
Tasmania